is a Japanese racing driver from Kobe, Hyogo Prefecture. He is known for holding the record for the most participations in the 24 Hours of Le Mans without an overall win, having run on 29 occasions (28 of which were consecutive) since . He is also third behind Henri Pescarolo and Bob Wollek for the drivers with the most participations.

He began his racing career in a Honda S600 in 1969, before he was taken on as Mazda's factory driver, a position he held through the 1990s including participating in the World Sportscar Championship and All Japan Sports Prototype Championship.

He also took class wins at the 24 Hours of Daytona on two occasions, including in the Mazda RX-7's debut race in 1979, scoring a GTU class win at fifth place overall. The other occasion was a fourth place overall finish and a GTO class win in 1982.

When he is not racing, he runs the Tokyo-based AutoExe tuning business, specialising in tuning parts and accessories for Mazda. and instructs on driving at NATS (Nihon Automobile High Technical School)

He is the father of voice actress Haruhi Nanao.

24 Hours of Le Mans results

References

External links
 Official website 
 Terada's blog page 
 AutoExe
 

1947 births
Living people
Japanese racing drivers
24 Hours of Le Mans drivers
American Le Mans Series drivers
World Sportscar Championship drivers
Long Distance Series drivers
Oreca drivers
Le Mans Cup drivers